The Dark Knight Rises: Original Motion Picture Soundtrack is the soundtrack to the film of the same name, the sequel to Christopher Nolan's 2008 film The Dark Knight. The soundtrack was released on July 17, 2012. The CD edition of the album contains an exclusive code to unlock three bonus tracks, titled "Bombers Over Ibiza (Junkie XL Remix)", "No Stone Unturned", and "Risen from Darkness". Two additional bonus tracks, "The Shadows Betray You" and "The End", are digital-download exclusive tracks. The soundtrack was officially released online for streaming purposes on July 10.

Additional cues were released through an iPhone app titled The Dark Knight Rises Z+ App Origins Pack. The app contains four original suites ("Wayne Manor", "Selina Kyle", "Orphan", and "Bane") that were created during the early stages of development for the film.

The main themes were composed by Hans Zimmer and James Newton Howard, but Howard did not return to the series to score this film and was not credited as a composer. Regarding his departure from the franchise, Howard said: "I just really felt that I had made what I felt like I could contribute to that series, and I always felt that... Hans... was the mastermind of those scores. I mean, they really sounded the way they sounded because of him. His conception of the scores was really brilliant. It's not that I didn't add a lot, I did, but I don't think I added the aspects of the music that really defined the character of those movies".

Just like Batman Begins and The Dark Knight the main motif always consists in just two notes, played by horns and accompanied by strings, representing Batman's pain and guilt.

In many tracks is reprised Batman's main action theme ("Molossus"), used as well in the first two movies of the trilogy.

The score won in the category "Best Original Score" at the Denver Film Society, while it was nominated in other events, including the Grammy Awards and the Saturn Awards. At the Brit Awards, Zimmer won as "Composer of the Year" for his work on the scores of The Dark Knight Rises and Man of Steel.

Commercial performance
The album debuted at number 10 on the Canadian Albums Chart and peaked at number 25 in the Spanish Albums Chart.

HDTracks version
A high-resolution, digital version of the soundtrack was released by HDTracks in 24-bit/192 kHz. It contains all the bonus tracks from the standard digital edition, but spectral analysis of the audio files shows they were not true high-resolution files, with no frequencies at all above 22 kHz or so (basically equivalent to a 48 kHz sampling rate).

Chant
The film features a prevalent chant of the phrase deshi basara, which, according to Hans Zimmer himself, means "rise up" in a language which he says he's happy to have kept secret (allegedly Moroccan or another Arabic dialect, even Mongolian word "deeshee bosooroi" means literally "Rise Up" though this is disputed).

Though the chant is not considered proper Arabic, it can be transcribed phonetically into dialectal Maghrebi Arabic as تيجي بسرعة (Tījī basara’ah), translated as either "come quickly" or "she comes quickly" (both forms are identical in Arabic, but the latter meaning would be a foreshadowing in the story), which is loosely consistent with Hans Zimmer's provided meaning of the chant.

When asked about the development of the chant, Zimmer said: "The chant became a very complicated thing because I wanted hundreds of thousands of voices, and it's not so easy to get hundreds of thousands of voices. So, we tweeted and we posted on the internet, for people who wanted to be part of it. It seemed like an interesting thing. We've created this world, over these last two movies, and somehow I think the audience and the fans have been part of this world. We do keep them in mind".

Reception

The score received mostly positive reviews. Heather Phares of Allmusic commented that "while Hans Zimmer's music for Christopher Nolan's Batman movies aren't as high-concept as some of his other scores, such as Inception or Gladiator, Zimmer ties the music for the final installment of Nolan's Batman trilogy to his previous scores, but allows these pieces to have their own flourishes as well".

Filmtracks, on the other hand, stated that, "lost in all of the media hype and sensationalism surrounding this franchise's second coming is the artistic merit of Nolan's achievements, and a contributing factor to the frenzy is undoubtedly Hans Zimmer's involvement as the concept's now most frequent musical voice". Filmtracks even went to the next level by stating that "unfortunately for Zimmer, his actual speaking voice is so prevalent in interviews that the soundtracks for these films have become their own form of spectacle. Not since John Williams of the early 1980s has a film composer become such a mainstream attraction, and Zimmer indulges the attention by constantly unleashing his thought process and sense of humor in interviews that don't always make much sense when strung together".

Jonathan Broxton of Movie Music UK wrote that "in many ways, The Dark Knight Rises showcases the best and the worst of Hans Zimmer's musical personality in one all-encompassing score. On the one hand, the intellectual design and intelligent use of Bane’s Chant shows Zimmer at his creative best, taking a simple idea and working it around to suggest complex concepts and subtle changes in context. On the other hand, you have the same old arguments: the Zimmer sound permeating the Hollywood mainstream to such a degree that composers as talented as Alan Silvestri and Patrick Doyle are being asked to ape the style; the fact that Zimmer himself seems to be stuck in a rut, writing what in effect are little more than variations of the same score on almost every action film he tackles; the over-reliance on electronic enhancements, ghostwriters, arrangers, and so on and so on. The bottom line is this: fans of the Zimmer style will love it, fans and of the current Batman style will love it, whereas anyone whose musical tastes tend to veer towards the predominantly orchestral will find a great deal of it boring, or unpalatable, or both".

Tracklist

Digital Bonus Tracks

Enhanced CD Bonus TracksMovieTickets.com Exclusive TrackZ+ App Origins PackTracks not included within the release of the soundtrack:'Recurring motifs
The score of The Dark Knight Rises contains many musical references to the previous films in the trilogy. Some notable examples of this are the following:
 The two-note motif which has served as a theme throughout the trilogy.
 The bat-flapping motif which has accompanied the opening logos for each of the three films.
 The music used at the beginning of the credits for each of the three films (which accompanies the Batman's first appearance in this film as well as in The Dark Knight).
 The music sung by the choir boy in "Rise", which also played in Batman Begins after the death of Bruce's parents.
 The music when Ra's al Ghul appears in this film, which is the same piece used in Batman Begins when he spoke to Bruce in the prison.
 The music that plays when Bruce first appears in this film, which also played when the adult Bruce was seen for the first time in Batman Begins after he awoke in the prison.
 The heroic theme which plays when Bruce escapes Bane's prison which also played when he was surrounded by bats in Batman Begins, when Batman used the BatPod for the first time and when he was escaping police at the end of The Dark Knight, and when John Blake was in the Bat Cave at the end of The Dark Knight Rises.
 The action theme which is heard when Batman is evading the police during his first appearance was also played in Batman Begins, when Batman summons bats in Arkham and escapes while running past the holding cells.
 The uplifting music used at the end of this film, which was the same piece used at the end of The Dark Knight when Batman told his plan to Gordon.
 The three note motif that plays when Batman defeats the villain, in this film right when Talia's truck goes over the edge of the overpass, in The Dark Knight when Batman throws the Joker over the edge of the building, and in Batman Begins'' when Batman glides out of the train before it goes over the edge of the rails.

With regard to recurring themes for the Batman character, Zimmer said: "I thought if we set up a couple of things you can recognise in a second from right at the beginning, like the ostinato, the little bubbling string figure, when he’s coming, when we get to the moment in the movie when he’s actually going to appear, you’d hear that stuff and really get excited. It was as simple as that. I wanted some little symbolic motifs that would signal to the audience that really, honestly, it is going to happen".

Chart positions

References

External links
Official site

2012 soundtrack albums
2010s film soundtrack albums
Batman film soundtracks
Hans Zimmer soundtracks
WaterTower Music soundtracks
The Dark Knight Trilogy